Zeytinova is a town in Bayındır district of İzmir Province, Turkey. The population of the town is 1485  as of 2011. The town was founded in 1973. Main crop of the town is olive. Tobacco, once popular, is now replaced by other crops.

References

Populated places in İzmir Province
Towns in Turkey
Bayındır District
Populated coastal places in Turkey